This is a list of actors who have played multiple roles in the same film. This does not include:
Actors who play a character with multiple names and/or a secret identity (e.g. superheroes);
Actors who play multiple copies of a single character (e.g. Vittorio Gassman and Don Adams [as St. Sauvage and Maxwell Smart, respectively] in The Nude Bomb, Hugo Weaving as Agent Smith in The Matrix series, and Tom Cruise in Oblivion);
Voice actors who do not physically appear on screen in multiple roles (e.g. John Rhys-Davies as Gimli and Treebeard in The Lord of the Rings film trilogy: Gimli is on screen, but Treebeard is a voice-only role) and Jennifer Tilly in Seed of Chucky (as herself and Tiffany);
Non-speaking extras, background artists or stock characters (e.g. Redshirts);
Compilation films (e.g. Charlie Chaplin Festival), or anthology films with separate, unconnected stories (e.g. Everything You Always Wanted to Know About Sex* (*But Were Afraid to Ask)).

A
 Bud Abbott as Eddie L. Morrison, T. S. Chandler and Their Grandmother in Little Giant (1946)
 Bud Abbott as Cuthbert Greenway and Ralph Greenway in The Time of Their Lives (1946)
 Bud Abbott as Mr. Dinkel and Mr. Dinklepuss in Jack and the Beanstalk (1952)
 Junko Abe as journalist Sakurako Takamiya and nurse Yui Takeda in The Prisoner of Sakura (2019)
 Victoria Abril as identical twins Clara and Ana in Too Much Heart (1992)
 Amy Adams as Amelia Earhart and Tess in Night at the Museum: Battle of the Smithsonian (2009)
 Ben Affleck as himself, Holden McNeil, Chuckie Sullivan, and the voice of the security guard in Jay & Silent Bob Strike Back (2001)
 Brian Aherne as John Evans and Malcolm Scott in The Man Who Lost Himself (1941)
 Hans Albers as Michael von Prack and Alexej Alexandrowitsch von Prack in Hangmen, Women and Soldiers (1935)
 Hans Albers as General Oronta and Jonny in Jonny Saves Nebrador (1953)
 Vera Alentova as Carol Abzats, Zemfira Almazova, Lusiena Krolikova and Whitney Crolikow in Shirli-Myrli (1995) 
 Don Ameche as Karl Freyman and Mario Signarelli in Sins of Man (1936)
 Don Ameche as Larry Martin and Baron Manuel Duarte in That Night in Rio (1941)
 Christina Applegate as Princess Rosaline and Julia Malfete in Just Visiting (2001)
 Cüneyt Arkın as Çetin and Ali Cengiz in Silahların Sesi (1965)
 Cüneyt Arkın as Nejat and Osman in Aşk ve İntikam (1965)
 Cüneyt Arkın as Tarık and Ahmet in İki Yabancı (1966)
 Cüneyt Arkın as Kemal and Orhan Şahin in Yüzbaşı Kemal (1967)
 Cüneyt Arkın as Malkoçoğlu and his son Polat in Malkoçoğlu Cem Sultan (1969)
 Cüneyt Arkın as Ali and his father Ahmet in Büyük Yemin (1969)
 Cüneyt Arkın as Islam Bey/Anton Kuravich and Petr Alekseevich in Ottoman Eagle (1969)
 Cüneyt Arkın as Battal Gazi, Hüseyin Gazi, Cafer in Battal Gazi Destanı (1971)
 Cüneyt Arkın as Kara Murat and his father in Kara Murat Fatih'ın Fedaisi (1972)
 Cüneyt Arkın as Battal Gazi and Seyyit Battal in Battal Gazi Geliyor (1973)
 Cüneyt Arkın as Battal Gazi and his father in Battal Gazi'nin Oğlu (1974)
 Cüneyt Arkın as Kara Murat and Mehmet in Kara Murat Kara Şövalyeye Karşı (1975)
 Cüneyt Arkın as Kılış Aslan and his father Süleyman Shah in Kılış Aslan (1975)
 Cüneyt Arkın as Olcayto, Halit and Başbuğ Toluğ Bey in Hakanlar Çarpışıyor (1978)
 Cüneyt Arkın as Detective Murat and Agent Brad in 3 Supermen Against the Godfather (1979)
 George Arliss as Mayer Rothschild and Nathan Rothschild in The House of Rothschild (1934)
 George Arliss as Richard Fraser and Lord Duncaster in His Lordship (1936)
 Filiz Akın as Mehtap and Hacer in Yankesici Kız (1964)
 Filiz Akın as Gül and Jale in İşportacı Kız (1970)
 Filiz Akın as Selma and Sevgi in Ömrümce Unutamadım (1971)
 Filiz Akın as Selma and Belma in Soyguncular (1973)
 Malaika Arora as Hetal, Sarla and Anarkali (in item song) in Housefull 2 (2012)
 Patricia Arquette as Renee Madison and Alice Wakefield in Lost Highway (1997)
 Sergei Artsibashev as Kirill and his father Kirill Grigoryevich in Promised Heaven (1992)
 Albert Austin as American Soldier, Clean Shaven German Soldier, Bearded German Soldier and The Kaiser's Driver in Shoulder Arms (1918)
 Albert Austin as man in Shelter and The Car Thief in The Kid (1921)
 Albert Austin as Street Sweeper and Burglar in City Lights (1931)
 Dan Aykroyd as Shire Judge Reeve Valkenheiser and Bobo in Nothing But Trouble (1991)
 Hank Azaria as Kahmunrah, The Thinker, and Abraham Lincoln statue in Night at the Museum: Battle of the Smithsonian (2009)

B
 Abhishek Bachchan as Nandu Bhide and Vicky Grover in Happy New Year (2014)
 Amitabh Bachchan as Don and Vijay in Don (1978)
 Amitabh Bachchan as Amit and Shankar in Kasme Vaade (1978)
 Amitabh Bachchan as Jay and C.I.D. Inspector Vijay in The Great Gambler (1979)
 Amitabh Bachchan as Ravi Anand and Babu in Satte Pe Satta (1982)
 Amitabh Bachchan as Master Dinanath and Raju (father and son) in Desh Premee (1982)
 Amitabh Bachchan as Sudhir Roy and Adhir Roy (Brothers) in Bemisal (1982)
 Amitabh Bachchan as Amit/Rana Ranbeer, Guru and Inspector Shankar (Triple Role as Father & his Sons) in Mahaan (1983)
 Amitabh Bachchan as Shekhar Malhotra and Tiger in Hum (1991)
 Amitabh Bachchan as Inspector Arjun Singh and Bade Miyan in Bade Miyan Chote Miyan (1998)
 Amitabh Bachchan as Thakur Bhanupratap Singh and Heera Singh in Sooryavansham (1999)
 Claudine Barretto as Rosita, Rosemarie and Rosenda Ocampo in Saan Ka Man Naroroon (1999-2001)
 Amitabh Bachchan as Lal "Baadshah" Singh and Ranbir Singh in Lal Baadshah (1999)
 Bae Doona as Tilda, Megan's Mom, Mexican Woman, Sonmi-451, Sonmi-351, and Sonmi prostitute in Cloud Atlas (2012)
 Buddy Baer as Sgt. Riley and The Giant in Jack and the Beanstalk (1952)
 William Bakewell as Louis XIV and his twin brother in The Iron Mask (1929)
 Nandamuri Balakrishna as Sri Krishna Deva Rayalu and Krishna Kumar in Aditya 369 (1991)
 Nandamuri Balakrishna as Arjun and Kishtayah in Maatho Pettukoku (1995)
 Nandamuri Balakrishna as Rama Krishna Prasad and Bhavani Prasad in Peddannayya (1997)
 Nandamuri Balakrishna as Sultan and Pruthvi in Sultan (1999)
 Nandamuri Balakrishna as Pundarika Ranganathudu and Lord Krishna in Pandurangadu (2008)
 Nandamuri Balakrishna as Srimannarayana and Narasimha in Simha (2010)
 Nandamuri Balakrishna as Harish Chandra Prasad, Rama Krishna Prasad and Bobby in Adhinayakudu (2012)
 Nandamuri Balakrishna as Jaidev and Krishna in Legend (2014)
 Nandamuri Balakrishna as Dharma and Arjun Prasad in Ruler (2019)
 Christian Bale as Alfred Borden and his twin brother Bernard Fallon in The Prestige (2006)
 Ike Barinholtz as Le Chiffre, Prophet, Dane Cook in Meet the Spartans (2008)
 Ike Barinholtz as The Policeman / Wolf / Anton Chigurh / Hellboy / Batman / Alex "Alexander" (Beowulf) / Prince Caspian in Disaster Movie (2008)
 Sacha Baron Cohen as Ali G and Borat (cameo) in Ali G Indahouse (2002)
 Sacha Baron Cohen as Admiral General President Prime Minister Haffaz Aladeen/Alison Burgers and his double Efawadh in The Dictator (2012)
 Richard Barthelmess as Lance McGowan and Robert Anders in Midnight Alibi (1934)
 Mathew Baynton as William Shakespeare, Lord Burghley, English Messenger and Customs Official in Bill (2015)
 Ralph Bellamy as Sir Edward Dominey and Baron Leopold von Ragenstein in The Great Impersonation (1942) 
 Jean-Paul Belmondo as Michel Gauché and Bruno Ferrari in Animal (1977)
 Roberto Benigni as Dante and Johnny Stecchino in Johnny Stecchino (1991)
 Henry Bergman as Henry Bergman as Fat German Sergeant, Paul von Hindenburg and Bartender in Shoulder Arms (1918)
 Henry Bergman as Professor Guido and Night Shelter Keeper in The Kid (1921)
 Henry Bergman as Sheriff on Train and Man In Railroad Station in The Pilgrim (1923)
 Henry Bergman as Mayor and Blind Girl's Downstairs Neighbor in City Lights (1931)
 Elisabeth Bergner as Sylvina Lawrence and Martina Lawrence in Stolen Life (1939)
 Halle Berry as Native Woman, Jocasta Ayrs, Luisa Rey, Indian Party Guest, Ovid, and Meronym in Cloud Atlas (2012)
 P. Bhanumathi as Vaani and Valli in Kalai Arasi (1963)
 Cate Blanchett as a fictional version of herself and her cousin in Coffee and Cigarettes (2004)
 Brian Blessed as Duke Frederick and Duke Senior in As You Like It (2006)
 Graeme Blundell as Alvin Purple and Balls McGee in Alvin Rides Again (1974)
 Christian Borle as Mr. Smee and George Darling in Peter Pan Live! (2014)
 Bourvil as Mathieu Dumont, 'Toine Dumont and Martial Dumont in All the Gold in the World (1961)
 Bruce Boxleitner as Alan Bradley and Tron in Tron
 Kenneth Branagh as Mike Church and Roman Strauss in Dead Again (1991)
 Klaus Maria Brandauer as Bror von Blixen-Finecke and his twin brother Hans von Blixen-Finecke in Out of Africa (1985)
 Neil Breen as Cade and Cale Altair in Twisted Pair (2018)
 Walter Brennan as D.J. Mulrooney and Knobby in The Gnome Mobile (1967)
 Beau Bridges as Louis XIV and Philip in The Fifth Musketeer (1979)
 Jeff Bridges as Kevin Flynn and Clu in Tron (1982)
 Jim Broadbent as Captain Molyneux, Vyvyan Ayrs, Timothy Cavendish, Korean Musician, and Prescient 2 in Cloud Atlas (2012)
 Mel Brooks as Governor William J. LePetomane, Yiddish Indian Chief, Aviator Appilcant, Back-up German Singer, and Cranky Moviegoer in Blazing Saddles (1974)
 Mel Brooks as Moses, Comicus, Torquemada, Jacques, and King Louis XVI in History of the World: Part I (1981)
 Mel Brooks as President Skroob and Yogurt in Spaceballs (1987)
 Joe E. Brown as "Whiskers" (Charles Augustus Holt) and "Brute" Hanson in So You Won't Talk (1940)
 Yul Brynner as Dan Slater and Kalmar in The Double Man (1967)
 Geneviève Bujold as Elizabeth Courtland and Sandra Portinari in Obsession (1976)
 Peter Bull as Caspar Femm and Jasper Femm in The Old Dark House (1963)
 George Burns as God and Harry O. Tophet (Satan) in Oh, God! You Devil (1984)
 Francis X. Bushman as John Conscience and John Power in Man and His Soul (1916)
 Francis X. Bushman as William Poatter and James Houston in The Voice of Conscience (1917)
 Rose Byrne as Younger Lucinda Embry & Diana Embry-Wayland in Knowing (2009)
 Rose Byrne as Bea and Jemima Puddle-Duck in Peter Rabbit (2018)

C
 James Caan as Jack Glenn and Jason Glenn (father and son) in Les Uns et les Autres (1981)
 Nicolas Cage as Sean Archer and Castor Troy in Face/Off (1997)
 Nicolas Cage as Charlie Kaufman and Donald Kaufman in Adaptation. (2002)
 Bruce Campbell as Elvis Presley and Sebastian Haff in Bubba Ho-Tep (2002)
 John Candy as Dennis Valkenheiser and Eldona in Nothing But Trouble (1991)
 Eddie Cantor as himself and Joe Simpson in Thank Your Lucky Stars (1943)
 David Carradine as The Blind Man, Monkeyman, Death, and Changsha in Circle of Iron (1978)
 Adriano Celentano as Herman and Gustav in Loggerheads (1978)
 Adriano Celentano as Asso, unnamed Card Ace and God in Asso (1981)
 Richard Chamberlain as Louis XIV and Phillipe in The Man in the Iron Mask (1977)
 Jackie Chan as Ma Yau (John Ma) and Die Hard (Boomer) in The Twin Dragons (1992)
 Lon Chaney as The Fisherman and Hunchback Fate in Alas and Alack (1915)
 Lon Chaney as Henry Norton and Porter Brixton in The Flashlight (1917)
 Lon Chaney as Blind Pew and Merry in Treasure Island (1920)
 Lon Chaney as Black Mike Sylva and Ah Wing in Outside the Law (1920)
 Lon Chaney as Dr. Arthur Lamb and the Ape Man in A Blind Bargain (1922)
 Lon Chaney as Professor Echo and Mrs O'Grady in The Unholy Three (1925)
 Lon Chaney as Grandfather Wu and his grandson Mr. Wu in Mr. Wu (1927)
 Lon Chaney as Professor Echo and Mrs O'Grady in The Unholy Three (1930)
 Charlie Chaplin as Adenoid Hynkel and a Jewish barber in The Great Dictator (1940)
 Geraldine Chaplin as Elena and Ana in Peppermint Frappé (1967)
 Geraldine Chaplin as Sarah Glenn and her mother Suzanne in Les Uns et les Autres (1981)
 Syd Chaplin as The Sergeant and Kaiser Wilhelm II in Shoulder Arms (1918)
 Syd Chaplin as Charlie's Friend and Lunch Cart Owner in Pay Day (1922) 
 Syd Chaplin as Eloper, Train Conductor and Little Boy's Father in The Pilgrim (1923)
 Graham Chapman as King Arthur, Voice of God, Hiccoughing Guard and Middle Head of Three-Headed Knight in Monty Python and the Holy Grail (1975)
 Graham Chapman as Brian, Biggus Dickus, and Wise Man #2 in Monty Python's Life of Brian (1979)
 Maurice Chevalier as Eugene Charlier and Baron Fernand Cassini in Folies Bergère de Paris (1935)
 Tommy Chong as Chong and Prince Habib in Things Are Tough All Over (1982)
 Priyanka Chopra as Anjali, Vishakha, Kajal, Hansa, Mallika, Pooja, Rajni, Nandini, Bhavna, Jhankhana, Sanjana and Chandrika in What's Your Raashee? (2009)
 Priyanka Chopra as Sana Bedi and Zaisha in Love Story 2050 (2008)
 Priyanka Chopra as Rukhsar, Radha and Aradhana in Teri Meri Kahaani (2012)
 Julie Christie as Mildred Montag and Clarisse McClellan in Fahrenheit 451 (1966)
 Christian Clavier as Jacquouille la Fripouille and Jacques-Henri Jacquard in Les Visiteurs (1993)
 Christian Clavier as Jacquouille la Fripouille, Jacques-Henri Jacquard, Prosper and Jacqouillet in The Visitors II: The Corridors of Time (1998)
 Andrew Dice Clay as Utah and Elmo in One Night at McCool's (2001)
 John Cleese as Sir Lancelot the Brave, The Black Knight, Tim the Enchanter, Second Swallow-Savvy Guard, Peasant #3 and Taunting French Guard in Monty Python and the Holy Grail (1975)
 John Cleese as Reg, Wise Man #1, a Jewish Official, a Centurion, Deadly Dirk, and Arthur in Monty Python's Life of Brian (1979)
 George M. Cohan as Theodore K. Blair and Peeter J. 'Doc' Varney in The Phantom President (1932)
 Ronald Colman as Sir John Chilcote and John Loder in The Masquerader (1933)
 Ronald Colman as Rudolf Rassendyll and King Rudolf V in The Prisoner of Zenda (1937)
 Kevin Conway as the Freak Show Barker, the Strip Show Barker, and Conrad Straker in The Funhouse (1981)
 Dominic Cooper as Uday Hussein and Latif Yahia in The Devil's Double (2011)
 Valentina Cortese as Queen Ariadne and Violet in The Adventures of Baron Munchausen (1988)
 Dolores Costello as Marie and Miriam in Noah's Ark (1928)
 Marion Cotillard as Marie and Lucie in Pretty Things (2001)
 Patrick Cranshaw as Pappy & Pippy in Bubble Boy (2001)
 Barry Crocker as Barry and Kevin McKenzie in Barry McKenzie Holds His Own (1974)
 Harry Crocker as Rex (a tightrope walker), a disgruntled property man and a clown in The Circus (1928)
 Bing Crosby as Duke Johnson and Junior Hooto in Road to Utopia (1946)
 Denise Crosby as Tasha Yar and Commander Sela (Tasha's half-Romulan daughter) in Star Trek: the Next Generation 
 Benedict Cumberbatch as The Necromancer and Smaug the Wyrrm in The Hobbit: The Desolation of Smaug (2013)
 Benedict Cumberbatch as Doctor Strange and Dormammu in Doctor Strange (2016)
 Tony Curtis as Casanova and Giacomo in Casanova & Co. (1977)

D
 Paul Dano as Paul Sunday and Eli Sunday in There Will Be Blood (2007)
 James D'arcy as Young Rufus Sixsmith, Old Rufus Sixsmith, Nurse James, and Archivist in Cloud Atlas (2012)
 Matt Damon as himself and Will Hunting in Jay and Silent Bob Strike Back (2001)
 Amyra Dastur as Madhumitha, Samudra, Kalyani and Shenbagavalli in Anegan (2015)
 Keith David as Kupaka, Joe Napier, An-kor Apis, and Prescient in Cloud Atlas (2012)
 Embeth Davidtz as Amanda Martin and Portia Charney in Bicentennial Man (1999)
 Bette Davis as Kate Bosworth and Patricia Bosworth in A Stolen Life (1946)
 Bette Davis as Margaret DeLorca and Edith Phillips in Dead Ringer (1964)
 Matthew Davis as Travis and Trevor Stark in Urban Legends: Final Cut (2000)
 Yvonne De Carlo as Rosa Melo and Tonya Melo in Passion (1954)
 Olivia de Havilland as twins Terry and Ruth Collins in The Dark Mirror (1946)
 Cliff De Young as Brad Majors and Farley Flavors in Shock Treatment (1981)
 Lana Del Rey as Eve and Mary in Tropico (2013)
 Dolores del Río as María Méndez and Magdalena Méndez in La Otra (1946)
 Alain Delon as Julien de Saint Preux and Guillaume de Saint Preux in The Black Tulip (1964)
 Alain Delon as William Wilson and his doppelgänger in Spirits of the Dead (1968)
 Louise delos Reyes as Alona Natividad-Ramos and Perlas "Pearl" Natividad-Villanueva in Kambal Sirena (2014)
 Winston Dennis as Bill and Albrecht in The Adventures of Baron Munchausen (1988)
 Eugenio Derbez as Felipe and Felipe's grandmother in Jack and Jill (2011)
 Aishwarya Devan as Meera and Mallika in Anegan (2015)
 Deven Verma as Bahadur and Bahadur in Angoor (1982)
 Dhanush as Ashwin, Murugappa, Ilamaran, and Kaali in Anegan (2015)
 Dhanush as Kodi and Anbu in Kodi (2016)
 Dhanush as Shakthi and Thiraviyaperumal in Pattas (2020)
 Dhanush as Kathir and Prabhu in Naane Varuvean (2022)
 Varun Dhawan as Raja and Prem Malhotra in Judwaa 2 (2017)
 Leonardo DiCaprio as King Louis XIV and Philippe in The Man in the Iron Mask (1998)
 Fritz Diez as Otto Hahn and Adolf Hitler in Take Aim (1974)
 Divine as Dawn Davenport and Earl Peterson in Female Trouble (1974)
 Divine as Edna Turnblad and Arvin Hodgepile in Hairspray (1988)
 Madhuri Dixit as Gaja Gamini, Sangeeta, Shakuntala, Monika and Monalisa in Gaja Gamini (2000)
 Sunshine Dizon as Sara/Vanessa in Impostora (2007)
 Natalie Dormer as Sara and Jess Price in The Forest (2016)
 Robert Donat as Donald Glourie and Murdoch Glourie in The Ghost Goes West (1935)
 Kirk Douglas as Harrison and Spur in The Man from Snowy River (1982)
 Richard Dreyfuss as Jack Noah and Alphonse Simms in Moon Over Parador (1988)
 Wheeler Dryden as Thereza's Doctor and Old Ballet Dancer in Limelight (1952)
 Hilary Duff as Lizzie McGuire and Isabella Parigi in The Lizzie McGuire Movie (2003)
 Lindsay Duncan as Lady Bertram and Mrs. Price in Mansfield Park (1999)
 Alexander Dyachenko as Konstantin Gromov and Dmitry Gromov in Brother 2 (2000)
 Adolf Dymsza as passenger of sleeping-car, taxi driver, speaker, waiter, clerk, shop-assistant, "bikiniarz" (beatnik) and boxer in A Matter to Settle (1953)

E
 Jesse Eisenberg as Simon James and James Simon in The Double (2013)
 Heinz Erhardt as Eduard Bollmann, Otto Bollmann and Heinz Bollmann in Triplets on Board (1959)
 Mehmet Ali Erbil as Captain Kartal and Zaldabar in Turks in Space (2006)

F
 Bill Fagerbakke as Harold the Mummy and Ted in Under Wraps (1997)
 Douglas Fairbanks as Joe and Texan Soldier in Martyrs of the Alamo (1915) 
 Douglas Fairbanks as Florian Amidon and Eugene Brassfield in Double Trouble (1915)
 Douglas Fairbanks as Coke Ennyday and Himself in The Mystery of the Leaping Fish (1916)
 Douglas Fairbanks as Ned Thacker and D'Artagnan in A Modern Musketeer (1917)
 Douglas Fairbanks as Richard Marshall III, IV and V in The Mollycoddle (1920)
 Douglas Fairbanks as Don Cesar de Vega and Zorro in Don Q, Son of Zorro (1925)
 Douglas Fairbanks as twins Mario and Lucien Franchi in The Corsican Brothers (1941)
 Frances Farmer as Lotta Morgan and Lotta Bostrom in Come and Get It (1936)
 Simon Farnaby as Earl of Croydon, Juan Domingo, Sausage, Dmitri Alexandrovitch and Fur Seller in Bill (2015)
 William Farnum as King Arthur and Inventor in A Connecticut Yankee (1931)
 Michael Fassbender as David and Walter in Alien: Covenant (2017)
 William Faversham as Victor Jones and Earl of Rochester in The Man Who Lost Himself (1920)
 Fernandel as Édouard Saint-Forget and his five sons Alain, Bernard, Charles, Désiré and Étienne in The Sheep Has Five Legs (1954)
 Jacqueline Fernandez as Ayesha and Tia in Roy (2015)
 Sally Field as Forrest Gump's mother and a reporter who asks him a question while running in Forrest Gump (1994)
 Ralph Fiennes as Ignatz Sonnenschein, Adam Sors, and Ivan Sors in Sunshine (1999)
 Mikhail Filippov as Vasya and his father Vasily Ilyich Prokhorov in Promised Heaven (1992)
 Larry Fine as himself and Larry's Son in Creeps (1956)
 Crista Flanagan as Oracle, Ugly Betty and a Spartan woman in Meet the Spartans (2008)
 Crista Flanagan as Juney and Hannah Montana in Disaster Movie (2008)
 Walt Flanagan as Woolen Cap Smoker, Egg Man, Offended Customer, and Cat Admiring Bitter Customer in Clerks (1994)
 Michael J. Fox as Marty McFly, Marty McFly, Jr. and Marlene McFly in Back to the Future Part II (1989)
 Michael J. Fox as Marty McFly and Seamus McFly in Back to the Future Part III (1990)
 Brendan Fraser as Bill and Hugh Winterbourne (twins) in Mrs. Winterbourne (1996)
 Brendan Fraser as DJ Drake and himself in Looney Tunes: Back In Action (2003)
 Brendan Fraser as Elliot Richards, Jefe, "Mary" and Abraham Lincoln in Bedazzled (2000)
 Pauline Frederick as Mrs. Sherwood and Marion Roche in One Week of Life (1919)
 Willy Fritsch as Tsar Alexander I of Russia and Uralsky in Der Kongreß tanzt (1931)
 Willy Fritsch as Jupiter and Amphitryon in Amphitryon (1935)
 Willy Fritsch as Dr. Wolfgang A. Wagenbichler and his twin Charly in 12 Hearts For Charly (1949)
 Robert Fyfe as Old Salty Dog, Mr. Meeks, and Prescient 1 in Cloud Atlas (2012)

G
 Sarah Gadon as Mirena and Mina Murray in Dracula Untold (2014)
Vice Ganda as Girlie, Peter, Mark and Panying in Girl, Boy, Bakla, Tomboy (2013)
 Andy García as Ruben Partida Martinez and his brother Robert Martin in Steal Big Steal Little (1995)
 Johnson George as 45 separate roles including Mahatma Gandhi, Leonardo da Vinci and Jesus Christ in Aaranu Njan (2017). The 45 characters are recognized as the most for any actor in a single film by the Guinness Book of World Records.
 Karen Gillan as Sarah and her clone in Dual ' (2022)
 Terry Gilliam as Patsy, Green Knight, Singing Camelot Knight #3, Gorilla Hand, Old Man in Scene 24 (Soothsaying Bridgekeeper), Sir Bors, and the Weak-Hearted Animator (Himself) in Monty Python and the Holy Grail (1975)
 Terry Gilliam as Another person further forward (at Mount – "Do you hear that? 'Blessed are the Greek'!"), Blood and Thunder prophet, Geoffrey, Gaoler, and Frank in Monty Python's Life of Brian (1979)
 Erich Gonzales as Agatha Magtibay Almeda, Erika Castillo and Dr. Carrie Ann Bermudez Almeda in The Blood Sisters (2018)
 Jackie Gleason as Sheriff Buford T. Justice, Gaylord Justice and Reginald Van Justice in Smokey and the Bandit II (1980)
 Domhnall Gleeson as Thomas McGregor and Mr. Jeremy Fisher in Peter Rabbit (2018)
 John Glover as twins John & James Jekyll in "Love, Valour, Compassion" (1997)
 Serdar Gökhan as Dogan Bey and Malkoçoglu Kurtbey in Malkoçoğlu Kurt Bey (1972)
 Rusty Goffe as a Jawa, Kabe, and a Gonk Droid in Star Wars (1977)
 Selena Gomez as Grace Bennett and Cordelia Winthrop Scott in Monte Carlo (2011)
 Mia Goth as Maxine Minx and Pearl in X (2022)
 Stewart Granger as Rudolf Rassendyl and King Rudolf V in The Prisoner of Zenda (1952)
 Hugh Grant as Rev. Giles Horrox, Hotel Heavy, Lloyd Hooks, Denholme Cavendish, Seer Rhee, and Kona Chief in Cloud Atlas (2012)
 Lawrence Grant as Kaiser Wilhelm II and his double Robert Graubel in To Hell with the Kaiser! (1918)
 Richard Greene as Mario and Carlos in The Bandits of Corsica (1953)
 Alec Guinness as Duke Etherel, The Banker, Reverend Lord Henry d'Ascoyne, General Lord Rufus D'Ascoyne, Admiral Horatio d'Ascoyne, Young Henry d'Ascoyne, Lady Agatha d'Ascoyne and Lord Ascoyne d'Ascoyne in Kind Hearts and Coronets (1949)
 Alec Guinness as John Barratt and Jacques De Gue in The Scapegoat (1959)
Vladimir Gulyaev as Volodya and Volodya's twin in The Diamond Arm (1968)
 Jake Gyllenhaal as Adam Bell and Anthony St. Claire in Enemy (2013)
 Jake Gyllenhaal as Tony Hastings and Edward Sheffield in Nocturnal Animals (2016)
 David Gyasi as Autua, Lester Rey, and Duophysite in Cloud Atlas (2012)

H
 Arsenio Hall as Semmi, Extremely Ugly Girl, Morris, and Reverend Brown in Coming to America (1988) and Coming 2 America (2021)
 George Hamilton as Don Diego Vega and Bunny Wigglesworth in Zorro, the Gay Blade (1981)
 Margaret Hamilton as Miss Almira Gulch and The Wicked Witch Of The West in The Wizard Of Oz (1939)
 Armie Hammer as Cameron Winklevoss and Tyler Winklevoss in The Social Network (2010)
 Tom Hanks as Dr. Henry Goose, Hotel Manager, Isaac Sachs, Dermot Hoggins, Cavendish lookalike Actor, and Zachary in Cloud Atlas (2012)
 Cedric Hardwicke as Ludwig Frankenstein and Henry Frankenstein in The Ghost of Frankenstein (1942)
 Cedric Hardwicke as Lord Pendragon and King Arthur in A Connecticut Yankee in King Arthur's Court (1949)
 Oliver Hardy as himself and Ollie Jr in Brats (1930)
 Oliver Hardy as himself and Mrs. Laurel in Twice Two (1933)
 Oliver Hardy as himself and Bert Hardy in Our Relations (1936)
 Tom Hardy as Reggie and Ronnie Kray in Legend (2015)
 Woody Harrelson as Merritt McKinney and Chase McKinney in Now You See Me 2 (2016)
 Laurence Harvey as Wilhelm Grimm and The Cobbler in The Wonderful World of the Brothers Grimm (1962)
 Lilian Harvey as Lilian von Trucks and Yvette in Her Dark Secret (1928)
 Lilian Harvey as Ann Garden and Jackson's Niece Molly in Lucky Kids (1936)
 Jack Hawkins as the Prince of Wales and Footpad in The Elusive Pimpernel (1950)
 Louis Hayward as Louis XIV and Philippe of Gascony in The Man in the Iron Mask (1939)
 Louis Hayward as Edwin Jekyll and Dr. Jekyll and Mr. Hyde in The Son of Dr. Jekyll (1951)
 Bella Heathcote as Victoria Winters and Josette du Pres in Dark Shadows (2012)
 Brigitte Helm as Maria and her robot double in Metropolis (1927)
 Kevin Heffernan as Phil "Landfill" Krundle, Gil "Landfill" Krundle, and Random Sausage Lady in Beerfest (2006)
 Michael Herbig as Abahachi and Winnetouch in Der Schuh des Manitu (2001)
 Freddie Highmore as Jared and Simon Grace in The Spiderwick Chronicles (2008)
 Terence Hill as Elliot Vance and Bastiano Joao Coimbra de la Coronilla y Azevedo in Double Trouble (1984)
 Arthur Hohl as Albert Woodruff and "Sniffer" Evans in It Is the Law (1924)
 Tom Hollander as Bloggs and David Blacker, in Breathe
 Bob Hope as Peanuts White and Eric Augustine in My Favorite Spy (1951)
 Geoffrey Horne as Paolo Franchi and Leone Franchi in The Corsican Brothers (1961)
 Edward Everett Horton as Richard "Dickie" Smith and Felix, the Great Zero, in Lonely Wives (1931)
 Edward Everett Horton as Jeremy Dilke and his doppelgänger in The Man in the Mirror (1936)
 Curly Howard as himself and Pop Howard in 3 Dumb Clucks (1937)
 Moe Howard as himself, Moella, The Models Father and Moe's Baby in Self Made Maids (1950)
 Moe Howard as himself and Moe's son in Creeps (1956)
 Shemp Howard as himself, Shempetta and Shemp's Baby in Self Made Maids (1950)
 Shemp Howard as himself and Pop Howard in Up in Daisy's Penthouse (1953)
 Shemp Howard as himself and Shemp's Son in Creeps (1956)
 Martha Howe-Douglas as Anne Hathaway, Molly, Spanish Courtier and Body Collector in Bill (2015)
 Vanessa Hudgens as Stacy DeNovo, Margaret Delacourt, and Lady Fiona Pembroke(second and third movies only) in The Princess Switch (2018), The Princess Switch: Switched Again (2020), and The Princess Switch 3: Romancing the Star.
 Barry Humphries as Aunt Edna, Hoot, and Meyer de Lamphrey in The Adventures of Barry McKenzie (1972)
 Barry Humphries as Senator Douglas Manton, Edna Everage, Meyer de Lamphrey, and buck-toothed Englishman in Barry McKenzie Holds His Own (1974)
 Brandon Hurst as Merlin and Doctor in Mansion in A Connecticut Yankee (1931)
 Jim Howick as Christopher Marlowe, Gabriel Montoya, Cynical Jester, Palace Doorman, Mysterious Man, Even Grubbier Thief and Party Planner in Bill (2015)
 Kate Hudson as Emma Dinsmore, Ylva, Elsa, Eldora and Anna in Alex & Emma (2003)
 Barnard Hughes as Dr. Walter Gibbs and Dumont in Tron (1982)
 Jonathan Hyde as Sam Parrish and Van Pelt in Jumanji (1995)
 Pooja Hegde as Rajkumari Mala Rana and Pooja Thakral in Housefull 4 (2019)

I
 Eric Idle as Sir Robin the Not-Quite-So-Brave-as-Sir Launcelot, the Corpse Collector, Roger the Shrubber, Peasant #1, the First Swamp Castle Guard, Concorde, and Brother Maynard in Monty Python and the Holy Grail (1975)
 Eric Idle as Mr Cheeky, Stan/Loretta, Harry the Haggler, Culprit woman who casts first stone, Intensely dull youth, Otto, Gaoler's assistant, and Mr Frisbee III in Monty Python's Life of Brian (1979)
 Eric Idle as Berthold and Desmond in The Adventures of Baron Munchausen (1988)
 Im Yoon-ah as Kim Yoon Hee and Jung Ha Na in Love Rain (2012)
 Pedro Infante as Juan De Dios Andrade, Lorenzo Andrade, and Victor Andrade in Los Tres Huastecos (1948)
 Rex Ingram as De Lawd, Adam and Hezdrel in The Green Pastures (1936)
 Rex Ingram as Lucius and Lucifer Jr. in Cabin in the Sky (1943)
 Jeremy Irons as Beverly Mantle and Elliot Mantle in Dead Ringers (1988)
 Jason Isaacs as Mr. Darling and Captain Hook in Peter Pan (2003)

J
 Hugh Jackman as Robert Angier/Lord Caldlow (The Great Danton) and Gerald Root in The Prestige (2006)
 Hugh Jackman as Wolverine and X-24 in Logan (2017)
 Jonathan Jackson as Rudy Gatewick and Oliver Gillis in Prisoner of Zenda, Inc. (1996)
 Peter Jackson as Robert and Derek in Bad Taste (1987)
 Rusty Jacobs as Max Bercovicz and David Bailey in Once Upon a Time in America (1984)
 Jagan as Jagan and Saamuda in Anegan (2015)
 Jang Keun Suk as Seo In Ha and Seo Joon in Love Rain (2012)
 Iva Janzurová as Klára and Viktorie in Morgiana (1972)
 Scarlett Johansson as Jordan Two Delta and Sarah Jordan in The Island (2005)
 Jeffrey Jones as Matt Skearns and Peter Van Der Haven in Out on a Limb (1992)
 Terry Jones as Sir Bedevere, Dennis's Mother, and Prince Herbert in Monty Python and the Holy Grail (1975)
 Terry Jones as Brian Cohen's mother (Mandy), Colin, Simon the Holy Man, and the Saintly passer-by in Monty Python's Life of Brian (1979)
 Louis Jouvet as Pierre Froment and Félix Froment in The Heart of a Nation (1943)

K
 Kamal Haasan as Rangadu and Shekar in Sommokadidi Sokokadidi (1978)
 Kamal Haasan as twins Babu and Rathinam in Sattam En Kaiyil (1978)
 Kamal Haasan as twins Kalyanam and Raman in Kalyanaraman (1979) and its sequel Japanil Kalyanaraman (1985)
 Kamal Haasan as Selvanayagam and Rajan in Kadal Meengal (1981)
 Kamal Haasan as Dharmalingam and Mohan inSankarlal (1982)
 Kamal Haasan as Ratan Chander and Ajay Saxena in Yeh To Kamaal Ho Gaya (1982)
 Kamal Haasan as Sethupathy and his twin sons Appu and Raja in Apoorva Sagodharargal (1989)
 Kamal Haasan as Michael, Madhana Gopal, Kameshwaran and Subramaniam Raju in Michael Madana Kama Rajan (1990)
 Kamal Haasan as Senapathy and Chandra Bose in Indian (1996)
 Kamal Haasan as Major Vijaykumar and Nandakumar in Aalavandhan (2001)
 Kamal Haasan as Rangarajan Nambhi, Govindarajan Rangaswamy, George W. Bush, Christian Fletche, Shingan Narahasi, Balram Naidu, Krishnaveni Paati, Avthar Singh, Kalifullah Khan Mukhtar and Vincent Poovaragan in Dasavathaaram (2008)
 Karthi as Rathnavel Pandian and "Rocket" Raja in Siruthai (2011)
 Karthi as Kaashmora and Raj Nayak in Kaashmora (2016)
 Karthi as Chandra Bose (Sardar) and Vijay Prakash in Sardar (2022)
 Ranbir Kapoor as Shamshera and his father in Shamshera (2020)
 Shammi Kapoor as Mike and Shekhar in China Town (1962)
 Shashi Kapoor as Kamal and Rakesh in Haseena Maan Jayegi (1968)
 Boris Karloff as Gregor de Bergmann and Anton de Bergmann in The Black Room (1935)
 Danny Kaye as Edwin Dingle and Buzzy Bellew in Wonder Man (1945)
 Danny Kaye as Jack Martin and Henri Duran in On the Riviera (1951)
 Danny Kaye as Ernie Williams and Lawrence-MacKenzie Smith in On The Double (1961)
 Zoe Kazan as Laurel and Audrey in The Pretty One (2013)
 Buster Keaton as Gardener, Delivery Boy and Cop in The Rough House (1917)
 Buster Keaton as Sheriff and Saloon Owner in Out West (1918)
 Buster Keaton played virtually every role, including a stagehand, a dance troupe, a full band and every member in the audience in The Playhouse (1921)
 Buster Keaton as himself and Princess Raja in The Hollywood Revue of 1929 (1929)
 Buster Keaton as Buster Garner and Jim le Balafré in Le roi des Champs-Élysées (1934)
 Howard Keel as "Stretch" Barnes and "Smoky" Callaway in Callaway Went Thataway (1951)
 Deborah Kerr as Edith Hunter, Barbara Wynne, and 'Johnny' Cannon in The Life and Death of Colonel Blimp (1943)
 Aamir Khan as Sahir and Samar Khan in Dhoom 3 (2013)
 Salman Khan as Raja and Prem Malhotra in Judwaa (1997)
 Salman Khan as Prem Dilwale and Yuvraj Vijay Singh, the namesake Prince of Pritampur in Prem Ratan Dhan Payo (2015)
 Salman Khan as Raja and Prem Malhotra in Judwaa 2 (2017) 
 Saif Ali Khan as Jai, Jimmy and Rakesh Rajpal in Aashik Awara (1993)
 Saif Ali Khan as Amar and Prince Vijay in Surakshaa (1995)
 Saif Ali Khan as Ehsaan Khan and Khalid in Kurbaan (2009)
 Saif Ali Khan as Jai Vardhan Singh and Veer Singh Panesar in Love Aaj Kal (2009)
 Saif Ali Khan as Ashok Singhania, Ashok 2 and Dr. Khan's assistant 1 in Humshakals (2014)
 Sara Ali Khan as a dual role in Atrangi Re (2021)
 Shah Rukh Khan as Arjun Singh and Vijay in Karan Arjun (1995)
 Shah Rukh Khan as Bablu and Manu Dada in Duplicate (1998)
 Shah Rukh Khan as Kishan Laal and Prem The Ghost in Paheli (2005)
 Shah Rukh Khan as Vijay and Don in Don (2006)
 Shah Rukh Khan as Om Makhija and Om Kapoor in Om Shanti Om (2007)
 Shah Rukh Khan as Shekhar Subramanium and G.One in Ra.One (2011)
 Shah Rukh Khan as Aryan Khanna and Gaurav Chandna in Fan (2016)
 Shakib Khan as Roni and Rocky in Jomoj (2007)
 Shakib Khan as Rajonno and Dr. Ricky Ibrahim in Bhalobashar Laal Golap (2009)
 Shakib Khan as Hero and Hira in Hero: The Superstar (2014)
 Shakib Khan as Ajaan and Ujaan in Bhaijaan Elo Re (2018)
 Shakib Khan as Captain Khan and Asif in Captain Khan (2018)
 Shakib Khan as Mass and Indrajit in Naqaab (2018)
 Kim Shi-hoo as Lee Dong-wook and Lee Sun-ho in Love Rain (2012)
 Guy Kibbee as Radio Director and The Chief in The Horn Blows at Midnight (1945)
 Terry Kilburn as John Colley and Peter Colley I, II, and III in Goodbye, Mr. Chips (1939)
 Klaus Kinski as Dave Emerson and Richard Emerson in Creature with the Blue Hand (1967)
 Kevin Kline as Dave Kovic and President Bill Mitchell in Dave (1993)
 Kevin Kline as Vince McCain and Rod McCain in Fierce Creatures (1997)
 Kevin Kline as Artemus Gordon and Ulysses S. Grant in Wild Wild West (1999)
 Harvey Korman as Krelman (the Cantina patron) / Chef Gormaanda / the Amorphian assembly-instructor in The Star Wars Holiday Special (1978)
 Elias Koteas as Casey Jones and Whit in Teenage Mutant Ninja Turtles III (1993)
 Werner Krauss as five (or more) antisemitic stereotypes in Jud Süß (1940)
 Meena Kumari as Sahibjaan (Pakeezah) and her mother Nargis in Pakeezah (1972)
 Ajith Kumar as Deva and Shiva in Vaali (1999)
 Ajith Kumar as Citizen and Subramani in Citizen (2001)
 Ajith Kumar as Deva and Shiva in Vaalee (1999)
 Ajith Kumar as Shiva and Vishnu in Villain (2002)
 Ajith Kumar as Guru and Jeeva in Attahasam (2004)
 Ajith Kumar as Jeeva, Shivshankar, and Vishnu in Varalaru (2006)
 Ajith Kumar as David Billa and Saravanavelu in Billa (2007)
 Ajith Kumar as Jeevanandham and Shiva in Asal (2010)
 Akshay Kumar as Jai Verma and Kishen Verma in Jai Kishen (1994)
 Akshay Kumar as Inspector Vijay Kumar and Lallu in Sabse Bada Khiladi (1995)
 Akshay Kumar as Rocky / Raja Parimal Chaturvedi in Aflatoon (1997)
 Akshay Kumar as Dev Kumar Malhotra and Anand Kumar Malhotra in Khiladi 420 (2000)
 Akshay Kumar as Jai Puri and Jeet Puri in 8 x 10 Tasveer (2009)
 Akshay Kumar as Shivam “Shiva” Bharadwaj and ASP Vikram Singh Rathore in Rowdy Rathore (2012)
 Akshay Kumar as Bahattar Singh and Tehattar Singh in Khiladi 786 (2012)
 Akshay Kumar as Harry Sinha and Rajkumar Bala Dev Singh in Housefull 4 (2019)

L
 Florence La Badie as Laura Fairlie and Ann Catherick in The Woman in White (1917)
 Elsa Lanchester as Mary Shelley and The Monster's Mate in Bride of Frankenstein (1935)
 Stan Laurel as himself and Stan Jr in Brats (1930)
 Stan Laurel as himself and Mrs Hardy in Twice Two (1933)
 Stan Laurel as himself and Alf Laurel in Our Relations (1936)
 Denis Lavant as Mr. Oscar, The Beggar, Motion Capture Actor, Monsieur Merde, Father, The Accordionist, The Killer, The Killed, The Dying, and The Man in the Foyer in Holy Motors (2012)
 Joey Lawrence as Ralph Bitondo and Ricky Prince in Prince For A Day (1995, TV film)
 Cloris Leachman as Agatha and Sophia on Double, Double, Toil and Trouble (1993)
 Aarif Lee as Law Chun-yat and Law Chun-yi in Echoes of the Rainbow (2010)
 Jason Lee as Dennis Pepper and Steve in A Better Place (1997)
 Jason Lee as Brodie Bruce and Banky Edwards in Jay & Silent Bob Strike Back (2001)
 Jennifer Jason Leigh as Elizabeth Whitecomb & Beth in The Love Letter (1998)
 Valérie Lemercier as Frénégonde de Pouille and Béatrice de Montmirail in Les Visiteurs (1993)
 Jack Lemmon as Professor Fate and Prince Hapnik in The Great Race (1965)
 Sunny Leone as Meera and Leela in Ek Paheli Leela (2015)
 Sunny Leone as twins sisters Laila and Lily Lele in Mastizaade (2016)
 Sunny Leone as Celina and Ambar Kapoor in One Night Stand (2016)
 Yevgeny Leonov as Eugene Troshkin and Docent in Gentlemen of Fortune (1971)
 Mark Lester as Prince Edward and Tom Canty in The Prince and the Pauper (1977)
 Jerry Lewis as Professor Julius Kelp and Buddy Love and Baby Kelp in The Nutty Professor (1963)
 Jerry Lewis as Willard Woodward, James Peyton, Everett Peyton, Julius Peyton, Captain Eddie Peyton, Skylock Peyton, and 'Bugs' Peyton in The Family Jewels (1965)
 Jerry Lewis as Gerald Clamson and Syd Valentine in The Big Mouth (1967)
 John Lithgow as Dr. Emilio Lizardo and Lord John Whorfin in The Adventures of Buckaroo Banzai (1984)
 Gene Lockhart as The Starkeeper and Dr. Selden in Carousel (1956)
 Lindsay Lohan as Hallie Parker and Annie James in The Parent Trap (1998)
 Lindsay Lohan as Aubrey Fleming and Dakota Moss in I Know Who Killed Me (2007)
 Gina Lollobrigida as Sylvia Sorrego and Helena Ricci in Flesh and the Woman (1954)
 George Lopez as Mr. Electricidad, Mr. Electric, and Tobor in The Adventures of Sharkboy and Lavagirl (2005)
 Myrna Loy as Morgana Le Fay and Evil Sister in Mansion in A Connecticut Yankee (1931)
 John Lund as Captain Bart Cosgrove and his son, Lieutenant Gregory Piersen, in To Each His Own (1946)

M
 Fred MacMurray as Eddie York and Francis Pemberton in Pardon My Past (1945)
 R. Madhavan as Sakthi and Kannan in Rendu (2006)
 Mammootty as Lawrence and Johny in Parampara (1990)
 Mammootty as Abubacker and Dada Sahib in Dada Sahib (2000)
 Mammootty as Balaram and Taradas in Balram vs. Taradas (2006)
 Mammootty as Appu and Achu in Annan Thambi (2008)
 Mammootty as Rameshan and Swami in Mayabazar (2008)
 Mammootty as Jimmy and Genie in Ee Pattanathil Bhootham (2009)
 Mammootty as Haridas, Ahmed Haji, and Khalid Ahmed (three roles) in Paleri Manikyam (2009)
 Mammootty as Madhavan and Kunhunni in Drona (2010)
 Mammootty as Karunan and Abhilash in Shikari (2012)
 Mammootty as Majeed and Majeed's Father in Balyakalasakhi (2014)
 Mammootty as Raja and Shivadas Naidu in Cobra (2012)
 Mammootty as himself and Mathukkutti in Kadal Kadannu Oru Maathukutty (2013)
 Madhubala as Banani, Nirmala and Deepak Mahal's owner in Phagun (1958)
 Mukesh Tiwari as Samudra's father (1962) and Radhakrishan in Anegan (2015)
 Miles Mander as Horace Granville and Harry Crowel in Daredevils of the Red Circle (1939)
 Terrence Mann as Ug and Johnny Steele in Critters (1986)
 Jean Marais as Jérôme Fandor and Fantômas in Fantômas (1964)
 Jean Marais as Jérôme Fandor and Fantômas in Fantômas se déchaîne (1965)
 Jean Marais as Jérôme Fandor and Fantômas in Fantômas contre Scotland Yard (1967)
 Fredric March as Kenneth Wayne and Jeremy Wayne in Smilin' Through (1932)
 Fredric March as Jean Valjean and Champmathieu in Les Misérables (1935)
 Fredric March as Jonathan, Nathaniel, Samuel and Wallace Wooley in I Married a Witch (1942)
 Jane March as Rose, Richie and Bonnie in Color of Night (1994)
 Miriam Margolyes as Aunt Sponge and Glowworm in James and the Giant Peach
 Cheech Marin as Cheech and Dwayne 'Red' Mendoza in Cheech & Chong's Next Movie (1980)
 Cheech Marin as Cheech and Mr. Slyman in Things Are Tough All Over (1982)
 Cheech Marin as a Border Guard, Chet Pussy, and Carlos in From Dusk Till Dawn (1996)
 Lee Marvin as Tim Strawn and Kid Shelleen in Cat Ballou (1965), for which he received the Academy Award for Best Actor
 Paul McGann as Girard and Jussac in The Three Musketeers (1993)
 Rose McGowan as Cherry Darling and Pam in Grindhouse (2007)
 Ewan McGregor as Lincoln Six Echo and Tom Lincoln in The Island (2005)
 Ewan McGregor as Jesus and Satan in Last Days in the Desert (2015)
 Charles McKeown as Rupert and Adolphus in The Adventures of Baron Munchausen (1988)
 Josh Meyers as Napoleon Dynamite and Owen Wilson in Date Movie (2006)
 Bette Midler as Sadie Shelton and Sadie Ratliff in Big Business (1988)
 Hayley Mills as Sharon McKendrick and Susan Evers in The Parent Trap (1961)
 Hayley Mills as Sharon Ferris and Susan Carey in The Parent Trap II (1986)
 Hayley Mills as Sharon McKendrick-Grand and Susan Evers-Wyatt in Parent Trap III (1989)
 Hayley Mills as Sharon McKendrick-Grand and Susan Evers-Wyatt in Parent Trap: Hawaiian Honeymoon (1989)
 Matthew Modine as Henry Petosa and Freddy Ace in Equinox (1992)
 Mohanlal as Jayamohan and Vikraman in Pathamudayam (1985)
 Mohanlal as Shobaraj and Dharmaraj in Shobaraj (1986)
 Mohanlal as Soap Kuttappan and Maathu Pandaaram in Padamudra (1988)
 Mohanlal as Charlie Chacko; plays an obese and normal character in Uncle Bun (1991)
 Mohanlal as Sachidanandan and Balakrishnan Bhagavathar in Naadody (1992)
 Mohanlal as Narendran and Unni in Maya Mayuram (1993)
 Mohanlal as Mangalassery Neelakandan and Mangalassery Karthikeyan in Ravanaprabhu (2001)
 Mohanlal as Shooranad Pappoyi and Shooranad Kunju in Udayon (2005)
 Mohanlal as Dijo John and Joy John in Photographer (2006)
 Mohanlal as Mathukutty; appeared as Father and Son in China Town (2011)
 Mohanlal as Colonel Mahadevan and Major Sahadevan in 1971: Beyond Borders (2017)
 Mohanlal as Ittymaani and Ittymaathan in Ittymaani: Made in China (2019)
Janelle Monáe as Helen and Andi Brand in Glass Onion: A Knives Out Mystery (2012)
 Julia Montes as Kara Dela Rosa and Sara Suarez in Doble Kara (2015)
 Cindy Morgan as Lora and Yori in Tron (1982)
 Dennis Morgan as John Keith and Derry Conniston in River's End (1940)
 Frank Morgan as Professor Marvel, The Gatekeeper, The Carriage Driver, The Guard, and The Wizard of Oz in The Wizard of Oz (1939)
 Temuera Morrison as Jango Fett and many clone troopers in Star Wars: Episode II – Attack of the Clones (2002)
 Scott Mosier as William Black, Angry Mourner, and Angry Hockey Playing Customer in Clerks (1994)
 Scott Mosier as William Black and Good Will Hunting 2 Assistant Director in Jay & Silent Bob Strike Back (2001)
 Mary Mouser as Savannah O'Neal and Emma Reynolds in Frenemies (2012) 
 Patty Mullen as Judy and Kiki LaRue in Doom Asylum (1988)
 Paul Muni as Eddie Kagle and Judge Frederick Parker in Angel on My Shoulder (1946)
 Eddie Murphy as Prince Akeem, Clarence, Randy Watson, and Saul in Coming to America (1988) and Coming 2 America (2021)
 Eddie Murphy as Maximillian, Preacher Pauly, and Guido in Vampire in Brooklyn (1995)
 Eddie Murphy as Professor Sherman Klump, Buddy Love, Lance Perkins, Cletus 'Papa' Klump, Anna Pearl 'Mama' Jensen Klump, Ida Mae 'Granny' Jensen, and Ernie Klump, Sr. in The Nutty Professor (1996) and Nutty Professor II: The Klumps (2000)
 Eddie Murphy as Kit Ramsey and Jefferson 'Jiff' Ramsey in Bowfinger (1999)
 Eddie Murphy as Pluto Nash and Rex Crater in The Adventures of Pluto Nash (2002)
 Eddie Murphy as Norbit, Rasputia and Mr. Wong in Norbit (2007)
 Eddie Murphy as Dave Ming Cheng and The Captain in Meet Dave (2008)
 Mike Myers as Charlie Mackenzie and Stuart Mackenzie in So I Married an Axe Murderer (1993),
 Mike Myers as Austin Powers and Dr. Evil in Austin Powers: International Man of Mystery (1997),
 Mike Myers as Austin Powers, Dr. Evil, and Fat Bastard in Austin Powers: The Spy Who Shagged Me (1999)
 Mike Myers as Austin Powers, Dr. Evil, Fat Bastard, and Goldmember in Austin Powers: Goldmember (2002)

N
 Tatsuya Nakadai as Takeda Shingen/Kagemusha in Kagemusha (1980)
 Nani as Arvind and Mahesh in Janda Pai Kapiraju (2015)
 Nani as Gautham and Jai in Gentleman (2016)
 Nani as Krishna and Arjun Jayaprakash in Krishnarjuna Yudham (2018)
 Nani as Shyam Singha Roy and Vasu in Shyam Singha Roy (2021)
 Nayanthara as Apsara Arjun and Maya Mathews in Maya (2015)
 Nayanthara as Bhavani and Yamuna in Airaa (2019)
 Yuriy Nazarov as Prince Yury of Zvenigorod and Grand Duke Vasily I of Moscow in Andrei Rublev (1966)
 Pola Negri as Lea and her mother Lydia in Der Gelbe Schein (1918)
 Sam Neill as Mr. Joe McGregor and Tommy Brock in Peter Rabbit (2018)
 Barry Nelson as Charles "Chick" Graham and Albert "Bert" Rand in The Man with My Face (1951)
 Jack Nicholson as U.S. President James Dale and Art Land in Mars Attacks! (1996)
 Assia Noris as Dora Nelson and Pierina Costa in Dora Nelson (1939)
 Edward Norton as Bill Kincaid and Brady Kincaid in Leaves of Grass (2009)
 Richard Norton as himself, a bodyguard, and a fitness trainer in ABBA: The Movie (1977)
 Ivor Novello as Michel Angeloff and "The Bosnian Murderer" in The Lodger (1932)
 N. T. Rama Rao Jr. as Shankar pehlawan and Munna in Andhrawala (2004)
 N. T. Rama Rao Jr. as Chari and Narashima in Adurs (2010)
 N. T. Rama Rao Jr. as Jai, Lava and Kusa in Jai Lava Kusa (2017)
 Lupita Nyong'o as Adelaide Wilson and her doppelgänger Red in Us (2019)

O
 A majority of the cast in O Lucky Man!, a 1973 British comedy-drama, play multiple roles.
 George O'Brien as Travis and Japheth in Noah's Ark (1928)
 Brendan O'Carroll as Agnes Brown and Mr. Wang in Mrs. Brown's Boys D'Movie (2014)
 Frances O'Connor as Alison Gardner and Nicole DelaRusso in Bedazzled (2000)
 Nick Offerman as Dutch, Joaquin, and Nick in The Go-Getter (2007)
 Pavel Olenev as Kuzma Ivanovich the water carrier and a chef in Volga-Volga (1938)
 Tom Oliver as the Bodyguard, a Bartender and a Taxi driver in ABBA: The Movie (1977)
 Ashley Olsen as Lynn Farmer and young Aunt Agatha in Double, Double, Toil and Trouble (1993)
 Mary-Kate Olsen as Kelly Farmer and young Aunt Sophia in Double, Double, Toil and Trouble (1993)

P
 Deepika Padukone as Shantipriya and Sandhya (Sandy) in Om Shanti Om (2007)
 Deepika Padukone as Sakhi/Ms. TSM and Suzy/Meow Meow in Chandni Chowk to China (2009)
 Jack Palance as Arnie Judlow and Bill Judlow in House of Numbers (1957)
 Michael Palin as Sir Galahad the Pure, First Swallow-Savvy Guard, Dennis, Peasant #2, the King of Swamp Castle, Brother Maynard's Brother, and the Leader of The Knights who say NI! in Monty Python and the Holy Grail (1975)
 Michael Palin as Mr Big-Nose, Francis, Mrs A, Ex-leper, Ben, Pontius Pilate, Boring Prophet, Eddie, Nisus Wettus, and the 3rd wise man in Monty Python's Life of Brian (1979)
 Lilli Palmer as Julia Klöhn and Angela Cavallini in A Woman Who Knows What She Wants (1958)
 Anatoli Papanov as Krokhalyov, chief, actor and sportsman in Nowhere Man (1961)
 Eleanor Parker as Laura Fairlie and Anne Catherick in The Woman in White (1948)
 Nicole Parker as Paris Hilton, Britney Spears, Ellen DeGeneres, Paula Abdul in Meet the Spartans (2008)
 Nicole Parker as Enchanted Princess / Amy Winehouse / Jessica Simpson in Disaster Movie (2008)
 Sarah Jessica Parker as Betsy Nolan and Donna Korman in Honeymoon in Vegas (1992)
 Larry Parks as Al Jolson and Himself in Jolson Sings Again (1949)
 Cezary Pazura as Jerzy Kiler and José Arcadio Morales in Kiler-ów 2-óch (1999)
 Harold Peary as Throckmorton P. Gildersleeve, Randolph Q. Gildersleeve, and Jonathan Q. Gildersleeve in Gildersleeve's Ghost (1944)
 Tyler Perry as Mabel "Madea" Simmons, Joe Simmons and Brian Simmons in many Madea films starting with Diary of a Mad Black Woman (2005)
 Maria Perschy as Claudia and Martina in Melody of Hate (1962)
 Cassandra Peterson as Elvira and Great-Aunt Morgana Talbot in Elvira: Mistress of the Dark (1988)
 Hay Petrie as Axel Skold and Erik Skold in Contraband (1940)
 Mary Pickford as Stella Maris and Unity Blake in Stella Maris (1918)
 Jeremy Piven as The Time Keeper (Danger D'Amo), Danger's Father, and Tick Tock in Spy Kids: All the Time in the World (2011)
 Elvira Popescu as Dora Nelson and Suzanne Verdier in Dora Nelson (1935)
 Henny Porten as Liesel Kohlhiesel and Gretel Kohlhiesel in Kohlhiesels Töchter (1920)
 Henny Porten as Liesel Kohlhiesel and Gretel Kohlhiesel in Kohlhiesels Töchter (1930)
 Natalie Portman as Ines and Alicia (Ines' daughter) in Goya's Ghosts (2006)
 Franka Potente as Iris Sellin and Siri Sellin in Blueprint (2003)
 Prabhas as Sivudu/Mahendra Baahubali and Amarendra Baahubali in Baahubali: The Beginning (2015) and Baahubali 2: The Conclusion (2017)
 Samantha Ruth Prabhu as Shakeela and Gadgi Moi in 10 Endrathukulla (2015)
 Micheline Presle as Janine Mercier and her daughter Jeannette in Paradise Lost (1940)
 Elvis Presley as Josh Morgan and Jodie Tatum in Kissin' Cousins (1964)
 Dennis Price as Louis Mazzini and his father in Kind Hearts and Coronets (1949)
 Vincent Price as Charles Dexter Ward and Joseph Curwen in The Haunted Palace (1963)
 Yvonne Printemps as Fanny Grandpré, Yvette Grandpré and Irène Grandpré in Three Waltzes (1938)
 Richard Pryor as Leroy Jones, Rufus Jones, and Reverend Lenox Thomas in Which Way Is Up? (1977)
 Jack Purvis as Jeremy and Gustavus in The Adventures of Baron Munchausen (1988)
 Liselotte Pulver as Liesel Kohlhiesel and Susi Kohlhiesel in Kohlhiesel's Daughters (1962)

Q
 Randy Quaid as Frank Crawford and Cornell Crawford in Moving (1988)

R
 M. R. Radha as Kabali and Amirthalingam Pillai in Bale Pandiya (1962)
 M. G. Ramachandran as Marthandan and Veerangan in Nadodi Mannan (1958)
 M. G. Ramachandran as King Desingu and Dawood Khan in Raja Desingu (1960)
 M. G. Ramachandran as Mohan and Komali in Kalai Arasi (1962)
 M. G. Ramachandran as Ramu and Ilango in Enga Veettu Pillai (1965)
 M. G. Ramachandran as Saravanan and himself in Thaer Thiruvizha (1968)
 M. G. Ramachandran as Anand and Sekhar/Babu in Kudiyirundha Koyil (1968)
 M. G. Ramachandran as King Vengaiyan and Prince Vengaiya in Adimai Penn (1969)
 M. G. Ramachandran as Velan and Raghu in Maattukara Velan (1970)
 M. G. Ramachandran as twins princes Manivannan and Karikalan in Neerum Neruppum (1971)
 M. G. Ramachandran as Murugan and Raju (alias Jairaj) in Ulagam Sutrum Valiban (1973)
 M. G. Ramachandran as Ponnaiya and Muthaiya in Pattikaattu Ponnaiya (1974)
 M. G. Ramachandran as Manickam (alias Rathnam) and Kumar in Netru Indru Naalai (1974)
 M. G. Ramachandran as Inspector Ramu "Payya" and Rahman Bai (alias Usthad Abdul Rahman) in Sirithu Vazha Vendum (1974)
 M. G. Ramachandran as Sundaram and Ranjith in Ninaithadhai Mudippavan (1975)
 M. G. Ramachandran as Shankar and Vijay Kumar in Naalai Namadhe (1975)
 M. G. Ramachandran as Selvam and Raja in Oorukku Uzhaippavan (1976)
 Ted Raimi as Cowardly Warrior, Second Supportive Villager, and S-Mart Clerk in Army of Darkness (1992)
 Ted Raimi as Mills Toddner, Wing, and Sign Painter in My Name Is Bruce (2001)
 Raimu as Achille Beaugérard and the other Achille Beaugérard, and as their father Alfred Beaugérard in The Brighton Twins (1936)
 Frances Raines as Alicia and Barbara Ann Michaels in Disconnected (1984)
 Rajinikanth as Billa and Rajappa in Billa (1980)
 Rajinikanth as Johnney and Vidyasagar in Johnny (1980)
 Rajinikanth as Chakravarthy and Santhosh in Netrikkann (1981)
 Rajinikanth as Raja and Ramesh in Pokkiri Raja (1982)
 Rajinikanth as Arun, Alex Pandian and John in Moondru Mugam (1982)
 Rajinikanth as John, Jani and Janardhan in John Jani Janardhan (1982)
 Rajinikanth as Balu and Shanker in Dharmathin Thalaivan (1988)
 Rajinikanth as Raja and Chinnarasu in Rajadhi Raja (1989)
 Rajinikanth as Kali Charan and Balu in Athisaya Piravi (1990)
 Rajinikanth as Shanker and Dayal in Tyagi (1992)
 Rajinikanth as Tamilazhakan and Tamilarasan in Uzhaippali (1993)
 Rajinikanth as Muthu and Maharaja in Muthu (1995)
 Rajinikanth as Arunachalam and Vedachalam in Arunachalam (1997)
 Rajinikanth as Baba and Babaji in Baba (2002)
 Rajinikanth as Saravanan and Vattaiyan Raja in Chandramukhi (2005)
 Rajinikanth as Dr. Vaseegaran and Chitti in Enthiran (2010)
 Rajinikanth as Kochadaiiyan, Sena and Rana in Kochadaiiyaan (2014)
 Rajinikanth as Raja Lingeswaran and Lingaa in Lingaa (2014)
 Rajinikanth as Dr. Vaseekaran, Chitti and Kutty in 2.0 (2018)
 Rajkumar as Prashanth and Prakash in Daari Tappida Maga (1975)
 Rajkumar as Arjun and Babruvahana in Babruvahana (1977)
 Puneeth Rajkumar as Munna and his father Shankar in Veera Kannadiga (2004)
 Puneeth Rajkumar as ACP Vikram and Vikrama in Rana Vikrama (2015)
 Shiva Rajkumar as Muthanna and Diamond Kiran in Mutthanna (1994)
 Shiva Rajkumar as Shiva, Ramu and Kumar in Annavra Makkalu (1996)
 Shiva Rajkumar as Subhash Chandra and Jeeva in Sarvabhouma (2004)
 Shiva Rajkumar as Ram and Bharamanna in Valmiki (2005)
 Shiva Rajkumar as Kumara Rama and Channa Rama in Gandugali Kumara Rama (2006)
 Shiva Rajkumar as Jeeva and Bhajarangi in Bhajarangi (2013)
 N. T. Rama Rao as Lord Krishna, Duryodhana & Karna (Triple role) in Daana Veera Soora Karna (1977)
 Tony Randall as seven sideshow characters in 7 Faces of Dr. Lao (1964)
 Noomi Rapace as The Settman Sisters (Monday, Tuesday, Wednesday, Thursday, Friday, Saturday, and Sunday) in What Happened to Monday (2017)
 Gary Raymond as Dick Lee-Carnaby and Graham in Traitor's Gate (1964)
 Christopher Reeve as Superman and Evil Superman in Superman III (1983)
 Keanu Reeves as Ted Logan and Evil Ted in Bill & Ted's Bogus Journey (1991)
 Frank Reicher as The Cook and Spy in Mata Hari (1931)
 James Remar as Butch Pooch and Ace Speck in Django Unchained (2012)
 Matthew Rhys as John Standing and Johnny Spence in The Scapegoat (2012) 
 Laurence Rickard as Sir Francis Walsingham, Lope Lopez, Stand-Up Jester, Chatty Guard, Slightly Late Courtier, Ian, Hanging Criminal and Chicken Drumstick in Bill (2015)
 John Ritter as Agent Pillbox and Bob Wilson in Real Men (1987)
 Pat Roach as Toht's Sherpa henchman & the German mechanic in Raiders of the Lost Ark (1981)
 Julia Roberts as herself and Tess Ocean, in Ocean's Twelve (2004)
 Muriel Robin as Frénégonde de Pouille and Béatrice de Montmirail in The Visitors II: The Corridors of Time (1998)
 Edward G. Robinson as Arthur Ferguson Jones and "Killer" Mannion in The Whole Town's Talking (1935)
 Edward G. Robinson as Max Stratman and Walter Stratman in The Prize (1963)
 Lara Robinson as young Diana Embry-Wayland, Abby Wayland, young Luclinda Embry in Knowing (2009)
 Roy Rogers as Guitar Player, Singer and Cowhand Len in The Old Wyoming Trail (1937) 
 Roy Rogers as himself and Billy the Kid in Billy the Kid Returns (1938) 
 Roy Rogers as Jesse James and Clint Burns in Jesse James at Bay (1941) 
 Roy Rogers as himself and Bill Sloan in Sunset on the Desert (1942) 
 Clayton Rohner as Clifford and Bruno X in Modern Girls (1986)
 Gilbert Roland as Kasim, the Desert Hawk, and Hassan, his evil twin brother, in The Desert Hawk (1944)
 Hrithik Roshan as Rohit and Raj in Kaho Naa... Pyaar Hai (2000)
 Hrithik Roshan as Krishna Mehra / Krrish and Rohit Mehra in Krrish (2006) and Krrish 3 (2013)
 Michael Ross as Tony the Bartender and Space Giant in Attack of the 50 Foot Woman (1958)
 Heinz Rühmann as Dr. Hans Pfeiffer and Erich Pfeiffer in So ein Flegel (1934)
 Heinz Rühmann as Peter Pett and Patrick Pett in Five Million Look for an Heir (1938)
 Heinz Rühmann as Dr. Lancelot Dodd and Dr. Ivor Marmion in A Mission for Mr. Dodd (1964)
Geoffrey Rush as Bill Sellers, Ann Howe, Stanley Kubrick, Peg Sellers, and Blake Edwards in The Life and Death of Peter Sellers (2004)
 Kurt Russell as Stephen "Bull" McCaffrey and Dennis McCaffrey in Backdraft (1991)
 Meg Ryan as DeDe, Angelica Graynamore, and Patricia Graynamore in Joe Versus the Volcano (1990)
 Winona Ryder as Mina Harker / Elisabeta in Bram Stoker's Dracula (1992)

S
 Vsevolod Sanayev as a bearded lumberjack and a member of the symphony orchestra in Volga-Volga (1938)
 George Sanders as Simon Templar and Duke Bates in The Saint's Double Trouble (1940)
 Adam Sandler as Jack Sadelstein and Jill Sadelstein in Jack and Jill (2011)
 Susan Sarandon as Madame Horrox, Older Ursula, Yusouf Suleiman, and Abbess in Cloud Atlas (2012)
 Rosanna Schiaffino as Ariadne and Phaedra in Minotaur, the Wild Beast of Crete (1960)
 Romy Schneider as Elsa Wiener and Lina Baumstein in The Passerby (1982)
 Arnold Schwarzenegger as Jack Slater and himself in Last Action Hero (1993)
 Arnold Schwarzenegger as Adam Gibson and his clone in The 6th Day (2000)
 Arnold Schwarzenegger as Terminator, T-800, "Pops"/The Guardian in Terminator Genisys (2015)
 Campbell Scott as Scotty Corrigan & Colonel Caleb Denby of the 19th Masschuetts Infantry in The Love Letter (1998)
 Lizabeth Scott as Alice Brent and Lily Conover in Stolen Face (1952)
 Randolph Scott as Leo and John Vincey in She (1935)
 Seann William Scott as twins Roland and Ronald in Southland Tales (2006)
 Peter Sellers as Fu Manchu and Sir Denis Nayland Smith in The Fiendish Plot of Dr. Fu Manchu (1980)
 Peter Sellers as Grand Duchess Gloriana XII, Prime Minister Count Rupert Mountjoy, and Tully Bascombe in The Mouse That Roared (1959)
 Peter Sellers as Group Captain Lionel Mandrake, President Merkin Muffley, and Dr. Strangelove in Dr. Strangelove or: How I Learned to Stop Worrying and Love the Bomb (1964)
 Peter Sellers as Général Latour, Major Robinson, Herr Schroeder, Adolf Hitler, The President and Prince Kyoto in Soft Beds, Hard Battles (1974) 
 Peter Sellers as Rudolf IV, Rudolf V, and Syd Frewin in The Prisoner of Zenda (1979)
 Jane Seymour as Elena Korvin and Maria Gianelli in The Phantom of the Opera (1983)
 Carmen Sevilla as Dolores and Rosa in Guerreras verdes (1976)
 William Shatner as Johnny Moon and Notah in Comanche blanco (1968)
 Moira Shearer as Sylvia, Daphne, Olga and Colette in The Man Who Loved Redheads (1955)
 Norma Shearer as Molly Helmer and Florence Banning in Lady of the Night (1925)
 Norma Shearer as Kathleen and Moonyeen in Smilin' Through (1932)
 Jackie Shroff as Suresh and Solanki Patwardhan Lal in Mera Jawab (1985)
 Jackie Shroff as Allah Rakha aka Iqbal Anwar and Don Jr. in Allah Rakha (1986)
 Jackie Shroff as Rajesh Bannerjee and Vijay Chauhan in Mard Ki Zabaan (1987)
 Jackie Shroff as Anil Varna and Jai in Vardi (1989)
 Jackie Shroff as Inspector Jai Kishen and Jamliya Jamshed Purwala in Azaad Desh Ke Gulam (1990)
 Jackie Shroff as Prince Harshvardan and Govardan in Dil Hi To Hai (1993)
 Jackie Shroff as Inspector Jai Kishen and Ram in Police Officer (1992)
 Sylvia Sidney as Princess Catterina and Nancy Lane in Thirty-Day Princess (1934)
 Alastair Sim as Millicent Fritton and Clarence Fritton in The Belles of St Trinian's (1954)
 Gene Simmons as Velvet von Ragner and Carruthers in Never Too Young to Die (1986)
 Michel Simon as Faust and Mephistopheles in Beauty and the Devil (1950)
 Sanjeev Kumar as Ashok Tilak and Ashok Tilak in Angoor (1982)
 Sivaji Ganesan as Vidyapathy and Narada in Saraswati Sabatham (1966)
 Sivaji Ganesan as King, Sekkizhar, Tiru Kurippu Thonda Nayanar, Sundaramoorthy Nayanar, Appar Thirunavukarasar in Thiruvarutchelvar (1967)
 Sivaji Ganesan as Periyalvar, Thirumangai Alwar, Thondaradi podi Alwar (Vibranarayanar) in Thirumal Perumai (1968)
 Sivaji Ganesan as Sedhupathy and Boopathy in Enga Oor Raja (1968)
 Sivaji Ganesan as Sankar, Kannan and Vijay in Deiva Magan (1969)
 Sivaji Ganesan as Ashok and Anand in Sivagamiyin Selvan (1974)
 Sivaji Ganesan as Kumaraiya and Sundaram in Manidhanum Dheivamagalam (1975)
 Sivaji Ganesan as Sekar and Sundaramoorthy in Ennai Pol Oruvan (1978)
 Sivaji Ganesan as Maanikam and Raju in Punniya Boomi (1978)
 Sivaji Ganesan as Rajashekharan, CID Officer Shankar and Guru in Thirisoolam (1979)
 Sivaji Ganesan as DSP Saravanan Sivaraj and Sangili in Sangili (1982)
 Sivaji Ganesan as Ramanathan and Raja in Sandhippu (1983)
 Sivaji Ganesan as Father James and S. P. Arul in Vellai Roja (1983)
 Sivaji Ganesan as Parthiban and Vikraman in Uthama Puthiran (1958)
 Sivaji Ganesan as Shankar and Ganesh in Annaiyin Aanai (1958)
 Sivaji Ganesan as Pandiya, Marudhu and Shankar in Bale Pandiya (1962)
 Sivaji Ganesan as the widower, the drunkard, the doctor, the gunman, the villager, the actor, the leper, the commissioner and the bridegroom in Navarathri (1964)
 Sivakarthikeyan as Rajini Murugan and Bosepandi in Rajini Murugan (2016)
 Sivakarthikeyan as Seema Raja and Kadambavel Raja in Seema Raja (2018)
 Red Skelton as Louis Blore and King Louis XV in DuBarry Was a Lady (1943)
 Red Skelton as Rusty Cammeron, Pop Cammeron and Grandpop Cammeron in Watch the Birdie (1950)
 John Slater as twin brothers Fred and Allan Bamber in Deadlock (1943)
 Kevin Smith as Silent Bob and Himself in Jay and Silent Bob Reboot (2019)
 Son Ye-jin as Ji-Hye and Joo-Hee in The Classic (2003)
 Mark Soper as Todd and Terry Simmons in Blood Rage (1987)
 Alberto Sordi as Marchese del Grillo and Gasperino in Il Marchese del Grillo (1981)
 Sissy Spacek as Mrs. Martin, Natasha, and two more mothers in Trading Mom (1994)
 David Spade as Damien Farley and Monica in Jack and Jill (2011)
 James Spader as John Westford and Rick Westford in Jack's Back (1988)
 Bud Spencer as Greg Wonder and Antonio Coimbra de la Coronilla y Azevedo in Double Trouble (1984)
 Brent Spiner as Data and B-4 in Star Trek: Nemesis (2002)
 Sridevi as Lord Karthikeya (six forms) in Malayalam film Kumarasambhavam (1969) 
 Sridevi as Sathi and Viji (Mother and Daughter) in Malayalam film Agneekaram (1977) 
 Sridevi as Tara and Radha's daughter (multiple characters) in Tamil film Machanai Partheengala (1978) 
 Sridevi as Shanthi and Jenny (twins) in Tamil film Vanakkatukuriya kathaliye (1978) 
 Sridevi as Seeta and Geeta (twins) in Telugu film Mosagadu (1980) 
 Sridevi as Uma and Rama (twins) in Hindi film Guru (1989) 
 Sridevi as Rajni and Neelam in Hindi film Nigahen: Nagina Part II (1989)
 Sridevi as Anju and Manju (twins) in Hindi film ChaalBaaz (1989) 
 Sridevi as Devi and Reshma (reincarnated character) in Banjaran (1991) 
 Sridevi as Pallavi and Pooja (Mother and daughter) in Hindi film Lamhe (1991) 
 Sridevi as Benazir and Mehendi (Mother and daughter) in Hindi film Khuda Gawah (1992) 
 Sridevi as Sunita and Kavita (aka Rosy & Priya - Twins) in Hindi film Gurudev (1993)
 Sriimurali as Jagan Mohan and Jayaratnakra in Bharaate (2019)
 Barbara Steele as Katia Vajda and Asa Vajda in Black Sunday (1960)
 Barbara Steele as Jenny and Muriel in Nightmare Castle (1965)
 Tommy Steele as Tony Whitecliffe and Tommy Hudson in The Duke Wore Jeans (1965)
 Mary Steenburgen as Julie Rose, Katie McGovern, and Evelyn in Dead of Winter (1987)
 Ben Stiller as Tony Perkis and Tony Perkis Sr. in Heavyweights (1995)
 Ben Stiller as Sam Sweet and Stan Sweet in The Cable Guy (1996)
 Ben Stiller as Larry Daley and Laaa in Night at the Museum: Secret of the Tomb (2014)
 Erik Stolhanske as Todd Wolfhouse and Baron Ludwig von Wolfhausen in Beerfest (2006)
 Lewis Stone as Rudolf Rassendyll and King Rudolf V in The Prisoner of Zenda (1922)
 Jim Sturgess as Adam Ewing, Poor Hotel Guest, Megan's Dad, Highlander, Hae-Joo Chang, and Adam in Cloud Atlas (2012)
 Prithivraj Sukumaran as Ventakesh / Siddharth in Robin Hood (2009)
 Prithviraj Sukumaran as Kelu and Krishnadas in Urumi (2011)
 Kemal Sunal as Hanzo and Cabbar in Hanzo (1975)
 Kemal Sunal as Şakir and his uncle Hasan Emmi in Sakar Şakir (1977)
 Kemal Sunal as twin brothers Kemal and Cemal in İyi Aile Çocuğu (1978)
 Kemal Sunal as Şaban and Kaleci Bülent in İnek Şaban (1978)
 Kemal Sunal as Osman and Seyfi in Gerzek Şaban (1980)
 Kemal Sunal as Abdi and Narcin in Kanlı Nigâr (1981)
 Kemal Sunal as Şaban Ağa and Dilaver Bey in Sosyete Şaban (1985)
 Kemal Sunal as Ali and himself in Bıçkın (1988)
 Suriya as Chinna and Karthik in Perazhagan (2004)
 Suriya as Vasudevan and Vetrivel in Vel (2007)
 Suriya as Krishnan and Suriya Krishnan in Vaaranam Aayiram (2008)
 Suriya as Aravind and Bodhidharma in 7aum Arivu (2011)
 Suriya as Akhilan and Vimalan in Maattrraan (2012)
 Suriya as Masss a.k.a. Masilamani and Sakthi in Massu Engira Masilamani (2015)
 Suriya as Sethuraman, Athreya and Manikandan in 24 (2016)
 Donald Sutherland as Charles and Pierre in Start the Revolution Without Me (1970)
 Tilda Swinton as twins Thora and Thessaly Thacker in Hail, Caesar! (2016)
 Tilda Swinton as sisters Nancy Mirando and Lucy Mirando in Okja (2017)

T
 Vic Tablian as Barranca and Monkey Man in Raiders of the Lost Ark (1981)
 Akim Tamiroff as Jules LaCroix and President Alvarado in The Magnificent Fraud (1939)
 Margarita Terekhova as Maria and Natalia in Mirror (1975)
 Marsha Thomason as Sarah Evers and Elizabeth Henshaw in The Haunted Mansion (2004)
 Emma Thompson as Amanda Sharp and Margaret Strauss in Dead Again (1991)
 Lea Thompson as Maggie McFly and Lorraine McFly in Back to the Future Part III (1990)
 Uma Thurman as Venus and Rose in The Adventures of Baron Munchausen (1988)
 Stephen Tobolowsky as Happy Chapman and his brother Walter in Garfield: The Movie (2004)
 Tom Cavanagh as Harrison Wells and 15 other versions of Harrison Wells in The Flash (2014)
 Lily Tomlin as Pat Kramer, Judith Beasley and Ernestine in The Incredible Shrinking Woman (1981)
 Lily Tomlin as Rose Ratliff and Rose Shelton in Big Business (1988)
 John Travolta as Castor Troy and Sean Archer in Face/Off (1997)
 Shannon Tweed as Cindy Lansing and Audrey Lansing in Last Call (1991)
 Stanisław Tym as Ryszard Ochódzki and Stanisław Paluch in Teddy Bear (1980)
 Türkan Şoray as Canan and Jale in Ne Şeker Şey (1962)
 Türkan Şoray as Behlül and Eylül Servan in Genç Kızlar (1963)
 Türkan Şoray as Ayşe, Zehra and Leyla in Ekmekçi Kadın (1965)
 Türkan Şoray as Türkân and Peri in Meleklerin İntikamı (1966)
 Türkan Şoray as Şükran and Leyla in Ağlayan Kadın (1967)
 Türkan Şoray as Nesrin and Leyla in Artık Sevmeyeceğim (1968)
 Türkan Şoray as Leyla and Hicran in Ağla Gözlerim (1968)
 Türkan Şoray as Şükran and Türkan in Mazi Kalbimde Yaradır (1970)
 Türkan Şoray as Leyla Ergüvenç and Şaziye in Gülüm, Dalım, Çiçeğim (1971)
 Türkan Şoray as Selma and Cavidan in Çılgınlar (1974)
 Türkan Şoray as Zeliş and Leyla Taner in Şenlik Var / Bal Kız (1974)
 Türkan Şoray as Aygül and Selma in Seni Seviyorum (1983)

U

V
 Vadivelu as Telex Pandian and 'Setup' Chellappa in Ennamma Kannu (2000)
 Vadivelu as Steve Waugh, Mark Waugh and their parents in Manadhai Thirudivittai (2001)
 Vadivelu as Vadivelu and Vibration in Bagavathi (2002)
 Vadivelu as A. Swaminathan and Muniyandi in Ilasu Pudhusu Ravusu (2003)
 Vadivelu as Pulikecei XXIII and Ukraputhan in Imsai Arasan 23am Pulikecei (2006)
 Vadivelu as Vellam (Tamilman) and Englishman in Nenjil Jil Jil (2006)
 Vadivelu as Indra, Yama and Na. Azhagappan in Indiralohathil Na Azhagappan (2008)
 Vadivelu as Tenaliraman and The King of Vikata Nagaram in Tenaliraman (2014)
 Rudolph Valentino as Ahmed and The Sheik in The Son of the Sheik (1926)
 Lee Van Cleef as Father John and Lewis in God's Gun (1976)
 Jean-Claude Van Damme as Alex Wagner and Chad Wagner in Double Impact (1991)
 Jean-Claude Van Damme as Alain Moreau and Mikhail Suverov in Maximum Risk (1996)
 Jean-Claude Van Damme as Rudy Cafmeyer and Charles Le Vaillant in The Order (2001)
 Jean-Claude Van Damme as The Replicant and Edward Garrotte in Replicant (2001)
 Dick Van Dyke as Bert and Mr. Dawes Sr. in Mary Poppins (1964)
 Vice Ganda as Girlie, Peter, Mark and Panying in Girl, Boy, Bakla, Tomboy (2013)
 Conrad Veidt as Wenzel Schellenberg and Michael Schellenberg in The Brothers Schellenberg (1926)
 Conrad Veidt as Balduin and his doppelgänger in The Student of Prague (1926)
 Conrad Veidt as Gwynplaine and Lord Clancharlie in The Man Who Laughs (1928)
 Conrad Veidt as Otto Becker and his pro-Nazi twin brother Baron Hugo von Detner in Nazi Agent (1942)
 Patricia Velásquez as Anck-Su-Namun and Meela Nais in The Mummy Returns (2001)
 Carlo Verdone as Enzo, Ruggero, Leo, Don Alfio and the Professor in Un Sacco Bello (1980)
 Carlo Verdone as Pasquale Amitrano, Furio Zoccano and Mimmo in Bianco, Rosso e Verdone (1981)
 Carlo Verdone as Sergio Benvenuti and Manuel Fantoni in Borotalco (1982)
 Carlo Verdone as Raniero Cotti-Borroni, Giovanni and Ivano in Viaggi di Nozze (1995)
 Carlo Verdone as Leo, Prof. Cagnato and Moreno Vecchiarutti in Grande, Grosso e Verdone (2008)
 Vijay as Gurumoorthy and Prasad in Azhagiya Tamil Magan (2007)
 Vijay as Pugazh and Major Saravanan in Villu (2009)
 Vijay as Kaththi a.k.a. Kathiresan and Jeevanandham in Kaththi (2014)
 Vijay as Marudheeran and Pulivendhan in Puli (2015)
 Vijay as Vetri, Maaran and Vetrimaaran in Mersal (2017)
 Vijay as Rayappan and Michael Rayappan a.k.a. Bigil in Bigil (2019)
 Vikram as Ramanujam "Ambi" Iyengar, Remo and Anniyan in Anniyan (2005)
 Vikram as Akhilan Vinod and Love in Iru Mugan (2015)
 Vikram as DCP Aarusaamy "Saamy" and his son IPS Ramasaamy "Ram" in Saamy² (2018)                       
 Vikram as Madhiazhagan (Madhi) and Kathir (Cobra) in Cobra (2022)
 Behrouz Vossoughi as Reza Motori and Faroukh in Reza Motorcyclist (1971)
 Vyjayanthimala as Madhumathi, Madhavi and Radha in Madhumati (1958)

W
 Anton Walbrook as Balduin and his doppelgänger in The Student of Prague (1935)
 Basil Wallace as Screwface and Screwface in Marked for Death (1990)
 Jack Warden as Roy L. Fuchs and Luke Fuchs in Used Cars (1980)
 David Warner as Ed Dillinger, Sark, and the voice of the M.C.P. in Tron (1982)
 E. Alyn Warren as Stephen A. Douglas and General Ulysses S. Grant in Abraham Lincoln (1930)
 Marlon Wayans as Alan, Dawn, Russel, Ethan, Baby Pete, Jaspar and Lynette Spellman in Sextuplets (2019)
 John Wayne as Football Player and Extra in Stands in The Drop Kick (1927)
 John Wayne as Horse Race Spectator and Condemned Man in Flashback in Hangman's House (1928)
 Hugo Weaving as Haskell Moore, Tadeusz Kesselring, Bill Smoke, Nurse Noakes, Boardman Mephi, and Old Georgie in Cloud Atlas (2012)
 Paul Wegener as Balduin and his doppelgänger in The Student of Prague (1913)
 Rachel Weisz as Evelyn Carnahan O'Connell and Princess Nefertiri in The Mummy Returns (2001)
 Orson Welles as Hagolin and Lamerciere in Crack in the Mirror (1960)
 Jan Werich as Rudolf II, Holy Roman Emperor and Matthew, a baker, his look-alike in The Emperor and the Golem (1951)
 Jan Werich as storyteller/castle warden Oliva and the magician in The Cassandra Cat (1963)
 Ben Whishaw as Cabin Boy, Robert Frobisher, Store Clerk, Georgette, and Tribesman in Cloud Atlas (2012)
 Peter Whitney as Mert Fleagle and Bert Fleagle in Murder, He Says (1945)
 Gene Wilder as Claude and Philippe in Start the Revolution Without Me (1970)
 Spencer Wilding as Nathaniel and Prometheus in Victor Frankenstein (2015)
 Ben Willbond as King Philip II of Spain, Earl of Southampton, Grubby Thief, Alexander Dimitrievitch and Head of Guards in Bill (2015)
 Guinn Williams as Al and Ham in Noah's Ark (1928)
 Michelle Williams as Annie and Glinda in Oz the Great and Powerful (2013)
 Robin Williams as Theodore Roosevelt and Garuda in Night at the Museum: Secret of the Tomb (2014) 
 Luke Wilson as Alex Sheldon and Adam Shipley in Alex & Emma (2003)
 Thomas F. Wilson as Biff Tannen and Griff Tannen in Back to the Future Part II (1989)
 Thomas F. Wilson as Biff Tannen and Buford "Mad Dog" Tannen in Back to the Future Part III (1990)
 Alex Winter as Bill S. Preston, Granny Preston, and Evil Robot Bill in Bill & Ted's Bogus Journey (1991)
 Jonathan Winters as Wilbur Glenworthy and Henry Glenworthy in The Loved One (1965)
 Norman Wisdom as Norman Pitkin and General Schreiber in The Square Peg (1959)
 Norman Wisdom as Norman Pitkin and Giulio Napolitani in On the Beat (1962)
 Norman Wisdom as Norman Shields/ Emily, his mother/ Wilfred, his grandfather (the P.M.) in Press for Time (1966)
 Martin Wuttke as Mr. Boerhaave, Guard, and Leary the Healer in Cloud Atlas (2012)

X

Y
 Yury Yakovlev as Ivan the Terrible and Ivan Bunsha in Ivan Vasilievich: Back to the Future (1973)
 Cem Yılmaz as Arif Işık / Komutan Logar Trihis / Erşan Kuneri / Komutan Kubar / Vumar's son Timar in G.O.R.A (2004)
 Cem Yılmaz as Arif Işık / Kaaya / Komutan Logar / Kubar / Enigma in A.R.O.G (2008)
 Cem Yılmaz as Zafer Yildiz and Besi in Coming Soon (2014)
 Cem Yılmaz as Ali Şenay and Boris Mancov in Ali Baba and the Seven Dwarfs (2015)
 Cem Yılmaz as Arif Işık and Erşan Kuneri in Arif V 216 (2018)
 Cem Yılmaz as Ayzek and Alpay in Karakomik Filmler (2019)
 Alan Young as Charlie Biddle, Mrs. Biddle and Mr. Henry Biddle in Gentlemen Marry Brunettes (1955)
 Alan Young as David Filby and James Filby in The Time Machine (1960)
 Robert Young as Brooks Mason and George Smith in Honolulu (1939)
 Sean Young as Ellen Carlsson and Dorothy Carlsson in A Kiss Before Dying (1991)

Z
 Jerzy Zelnik plays the protagonist, Ramses XIII, and his nemesis, Lykon, in Pharaoh (1966)
 George Zucco as Dr. Lloyd Clayton and Dr. Elwyn Clayton in Dead Men Walk (1943)
 Daphne Zuniga as Kelly and Terry Fairchild in The Initiation (1984)
 Zhou Xun as Talbot (Hotel Manager), Yoona-939, and Rose in Cloud Atlas (2012)

See also
List of characters played by multiple actors in the same film

References

External links
List of B-westerns featuring dual performances

Multiple, Film